Lynnt Audoor (born 13 October 2003) is a Belgian professional footballer who plays as a midfielder for Belgian First Division B side Club NXT and the Belgium U17

Club career
Audoor began his career at the youth academy of Club Brugge. On 20 September 2020, Audoor made his debut for Brugge's reserve side, Club NXT in the Belgian First Division B against Lierse. He came on as a 78th minute substitute as NXT lost 1–2.

Career statistics

Club

References

2003 births
Living people
Belgian footballers
Association football midfielders
Club NXT players
Challenger Pro League players